Britt Reid (born April 28, 1985) is a former American football coach. He most recently served as an outside linebackers coach for the Kansas City Chiefs of the National Football League (NFL). His coaching career began when he worked for his father Andy Reid as a Practice Squad Coach Intern in 2009 with the Philadelphia Eagles and continued as he worked in multiple defensive coaching positions for his father with the Kansas City Chiefs from 2013-2020. Reid won Super Bowl LIV as the Chiefs' linebackers and outside linebackers coach.

Following the 2020 season, his contract expired and he was not offered a new contract due to legal issues that occurred towards the end of the season.

Early years
Reid was born in Los Angeles. He is the son of Andy Reid. For four years, he played football at Harriton High School, in the suburbs of Philadelphia, serving as the team captain for three seasons. Reid played in the East-West All-Star Game as a senior. He attended college at Temple University and received a bachelor's degree in communications.

Coaching career
In 2008, Reid was an assistant offensive line coach at St. Joseph's Preparatory School in Philadelphia. In 2009, he was a training camp coordinator intern for the Philadelphia Eagles, under his father, Andy Reid. Prior to his graduation, Reid served as a student assistant for the Temple football program for two seasons assisting the offense. Reid also spent two years (2011–12) working at the Steve Addazio football camp. Following his graduation, he joined his father on the Kansas City Chiefs coaching staff in 2013 as the Defensive Quality Control Coach. This was followed by Assistant Defensive Line Coach in 2015, the Defensive Line Coach from 2016 to 2018, and the Linebackers/Outside Linebackers Coach, which he held until 2020.

Legal troubles
In 2007, Britt was sentenced to 8 to 23 months in jail alongside his brother Garrett for running what a Norristown, Pennsylvania judge then called a "drug emporium" out of the Reid residence.

The same year, in 2007, Reid was involved in a road rage incident in which he allegedly pointed a gun at another man's face. A lawsuit was eventually settled out of court for an undisclosed sum in 2014.

Reid crashed into two parked cars on February 4, 2021, injuring two young children near the Chiefs' training complex, just a few days before Super Bowl LV. Reid admitted to officers he had consumed two to three drinks earlier in the evening and was on Adderall, a prescription medication used to treat attention deficit disorder. Two hours after the crash, according to a probable cause statement, Reid had a blood alcohol concentration of 0.113, above the legal limit of 0.08. Reid, as well as a five-year-old passenger of another vehicle, were both hospitalized. The five-year-old passenger was in critical condition and spent ten days in a coma.  On April 2, 2021, roughly two months after the accident, the five-year-old girl was released from the hospital, still unable to walk or talk and being fed through a feeding tube. The crime led the Chiefs to not renew Reid's contract, which expired at the end of the 2020 season. On April 12, he was charged with a DWI, which is a D-Level felony which carries a maximum sentence of seven years in prison. On November 19, 2021, the Kansas City Chiefs announced that they would pay for all of the medical expenses for the five-year old, giving her medical care and providing her and her family long-term financial stability. He pleaded guilty to the charges on September 12, 2022, as part of a plea deal. The plea deal will result in his sentence ranging from probation to four years in prison. He was sentenced to 3 years in prison on November 1, 2022.

References

External links
 Kansas City Chiefs profile

1985 births
Living people
Kansas City Chiefs coaches
Temple Owls football coaches
High school football coaches in Pennsylvania
Temple University alumni
Sportspeople from Los Angeles
People from Lower Merion Township, Pennsylvania
Coaches of American football from Pennsylvania